This is a list of butterflies of Armenia. About 230 species are known from Armenia.

Hesperiidae

Pyrginae
Carcharodus alceae 
Carcharodus floccifera 
Carcharodus lavatherae 
Carcharodus orientalis 
Carcharodus stauderi 
Erynnis marloyi 
Erynnis tages unicolor 
Muschampia poggei 
Muschampia tersa 
Muschampia tessellum 
Pyrgus alveus 
Pyrgus armoricanus 
Pyrgus carthami 
Pyrgus cinarae 
Pyrgus cirsii 
Pyrgus jupei 
Pyrgus melotis 
Pyrgus serratulae major 
Pyrgus sidae 
Spialia orbifer 
Spialia phlomidis

Hesperiinae
Eogenes alcides 
Gegenes nostrodamus 
Hesperia comma comma 
Ochlodes sylvanus 
Thymelicus acteon 
Thymelicus hyrax 
Thymelicus lineola 
Thymelicus sylvestris syriaca

Papilionidae

Parnassiinae
Parnassius mnemosyne nubilosus 
Parnassius apollo tkatshukovi

Papilioninae
Iphiclides podalirius persica 
Papilio machaon syriacus 
Papilio alexanor orientalis

Pieridae

Dismorphiinae
Leptidea sinapis 
Leptidea juvernica 
Leptidea duponcheli maiae

Coliadinae
Colias alfacariensis 
Colias chlorocoma 
Colias aurorina 
Colias thisoa 
Colias croceus 
Gonepteryx rhamni miljanowskii 
Gonepteryx farinosa turcirana

Pierinae
Anthocharis cardamines 
Anthocharis carolinae 
Anthocharis damone eunomia 
Anthocharis gruneri armeniaca 
Aporia crataegi 
Euchloe ausonia taurica 
Pieris bowdeni 
Pieris brassicae 
Pieris caucasica 
Pieris ergane detersa 
Pieris krueperi krueperi 
Pieris napi pseudorapae 
Pieris napi suffusa 
Pieris rapae transcaucasica 
Pontia callidice chrysidice 
Pontia chloridice 
Pontia edusa edusa 
Zegris eupheme menestho

Lycaenidae

Lycaeninae
Lycaena phlaeas 
Lycaena virgaureae armeniaca 
Lycaena tityrus 
Lycaena alciphron melibeus 
Lycaena candens 
Lycaena thersamon 
Lycaena kurdistanica 
Lycaena ochimus 
Lycaena asabinus 
Lycaena thetis 
Lycaena phoenicura

Polyommatinae
Agriades pyrenaicus dardanus 
Aricia agestis azerbaidzhana 
Aricia anteros 
Aricia artaxerxes allous 
Aricia crassipuncta 
Aricia isaurica latimargo 
Celastrina argiolus 
Cupido argiades 
Cupido minimus 
Cupido osiris 
Cupido staudingeri 
Cyaniris bellis antiochena 
Eumedonia eumedon 
Freyeria trochylus 
Glaucopsyche alexis lugens 
Iolana iolas lessei 
Kretania alcedo 
Kretania eurypilus 
Kretania sephirus 
Kretania zephyrinus ordubadi 
Lampides boeticus 
Leptotes pirithous 
Lysandra bellargus 
Lysandra corydonius caucasica 
Neolysandra coelestina coelestina 
Neolysandra diana 
Phengaris arion zara 
Phengaris nausithous 
Phengaris rebeli monticola 
Plebejidea loewii 
Plebejus argus bellus 
Plebejus christophi transcaucasicus 
Plebejus idas altarmenus 
Polyommatus alcestis 
Polyommatus alticola 
Polyommatus altivagans 
Polyommatus amandus 
Polyommatus aserbeidschanus 
Polyommatus cyaneus 
Polyommatus damon 
Polyommatus damonides 
Polyommatus daphnis versicolor 
Polyommatus demavendi 
Polyommatus dorylas 
Polyommatus eriwanensis 
Polyommatus eros 
Polyommatus firdussi 
Polyommatus huberti 
Polyommatus icarus 
Polyommatus iphigenia 
Polyommatus myrrha 
Polyommatus neglecta 
Polyommatus ninae 
Polyommatus ripartii 
Polyommatus surakovi 
Polyommatus thersites 
Polyommatus turcicus 
Polyommatus vanensis 
Pseudophilotes vicrama schiffermuelleri 
Tarucus balkanicus 
Turanana endymion

Theclinae
Callophrys armeniaca 
Callophrys chalybeitincta 
Callophrys danchenkoi 
Callophrys paulae 
Callophrys rubi 
Neozephyrus quercus 
Satyrium abdominalis 
Satyrium acaciae 
Satyrium hyrcanicum 
Satyrium ilicis 
Satyrium ledereri 
Satyrium spini melantho 
Satyrium w-album 
Tomares callimachus 
Tomares romanovi

Nymphalidae

Libytheinae
Libythea celtis

Heliconiinae
Argynnis paphia 
Argynnis pandora 
Brenthis hecate 
Brenthis daphne 
Brenthis ino 
Boloria euphrosyne dagestanica 
Boloria dia 
Boloria caucasica 
Fabriciana adippe taurica 
Fabriciana niobe gigantea 
Issoria lathonia
Speyeria aglaja ottomana

Nymphalinae
Aglais io 
Aglais urticae turcica 
Euphydryas aurinia 
Melitaea arduinna kocaki 
Melitaea athalia athalia 
Melitaea aurelia 
Melitaea caucasogenita 
Melitaea cinxia 
Melitaea diamina 
Melitaea didyma 
Melitaea interrupta 
Melitaea persea 
Melitaea phoebe ottonis 
Melitaea telona 
Melitaea trivia caucasi 
Melitaea turkmenica 
Nymphalis antiopa 
Nymphalis polychloros 
Nymphalis xanthomelas 
Polygonia c-album 
Polygonia egea 
Vanessa atalanta 
Vanessa cardui

Limenitinae
Limenitis camilla 
Limenitis reducta reducta 
Neptis rivularis ludmilla

Apaturinae
Thaleropis ionia

Satyrinae
Arethusana arethusa 
Brintesia circe venusta 
Chazara bischoffi 
Chazara briseis armena 
Chazara persephone 
Coenonympha arcania 
Coenonympha glycerion alta 
Coenonympha leander obscura 
Coenonympha lyllus 
Coenonympha pamphilus marginata 
Coenonympha saadi 
Coenonympha symphyta 
Erebia aethiops melusina 
Erebia graucasica 
Erebia medusa psodea 
Esperarge climene 
Hipparchia fatua 
Hipparchia parisatis 
Hipparchia pellucida 
Hipparchia statilinus 
Hipparchia syriaca 
Hyponephele lupinus 
Hyponephele lycaon 
Hyponephele lycaonoides 
Hyponephele naricoides 
Lasiommata maera orientalis 
Lasiommata megera megerina 
Maniola jurtina strandiana 
Melanargia galathea satnia 
Melanargia larissa astanda 
Melanargia russiae 
Minois dryas 
Pararge aegeria tircis 
Proterebia afra hyrcana 
Pseudochazara beroe rhena 
Pseudochazara daghestana 
Pseudochazara geyeri 
Pseudochazara pelopea 
Pseudochazara schahrudensis 
Pseudochazara thelephassa 
Satyrus amasinus 
Satyrus effendi

References

Armenia
Armenia
Fauna of Armenia
Butterflies